Seungsahn Haengwon (August 1, 1927November 30, 2004), born Duk-In Lee, was a Korean Seon master of the Jogye Order and founder of the international Kwan Um School of Zen. He was the seventy-eighth Patriarch in his lineage. As one of the early Korean Zen masters to settle in the United States, he opened many temples and practice groups across the globe. He was known for his charismatic style and direct presentation of Zen, which was well tailored for the Western audience.

Known by students for his many correspondences with them through letters, his utilization of dharma combat and expressions such as "only don't know" or "only go straight" in teachings, he was conferred the honorific title of Dae Jong Sa in June 2004 by the Jogye Order for a lifetime of achievements. Considered the highest honor to have bestowed upon one in the order, the title translates "Great Lineage Master" and was bestowed for his establishment of the World Wide Kwan Um School of Zen. He died in November that year at Hwagaesa in Seoul, South Korea, at age 77.

Early life and education

Seung Sahn was born in 1927 as Duk-In Lee (modern romanisation: Yi Deog'in) in Sunchon (순천), South Pyongan Province of occupied Korea (now North Korea) to Presbyterian parents. In 1944, he joined an underground resistance movement in response to the ongoing occupation of Korea by the Empire of Japan. He was captured by Japanese police shortly after, avoided a death sentence, and spent time in prison. Upon his release, he studied Western philosophy at Dongguk University. One day, a monk friend of his lent him a copy of the Diamond Sutra. While reading the text, he became inspired to ordain as a monk and left school, receiving the prātimokṣa precepts in 1948. Seung Sahn then performed a one-hundred day solitary retreat in the mountains of Korea, living on a diet of pine needles and rain water. It is believed he attained enlightenment on this retreat.

While seeking out a teacher who could confirm his enlightenment, he found Kobong, who told him to keep a not-knowing mind. In the fall of 1948, Seung Sahn learned dharma combat while sitting a one-hundred day sesshin at Sudeoksa—where he was known to stir up mischief, nearly being expelled from the monastery. After the sesshin was concluded, he received dharma transmission (inka) from two masters, Keumbong and Keum'oh. He then went to see Kobong, who confirmed Seungsahn's enlightenment on January 25, 1949, and gave him dharma transmission as well. Seung Sahn is the only person Kobong gave Dharma transmission to. He spent the next three years in observed silence.

Career

Drafted into the Republic of Korea Army in 1953, he served as an  army chaplain and then as a captain for almost five years, taking over for Kobong as abbot of Hwagaesa in Seoul, South Korea in 1957. In the next decade, he would go on to found Buddhist temples in Hong Kong and Japan. While in Japan, he was acquainted with the kōan (Korean gong'an) tradition of the Rinzai school of Zen, likely undergoing kōan study with a Rinzai master.

Coming to the United States in 1972, he settled in Providence, Rhode Island and worked at a laundromat as a repairman, spending much of his off time improving upon his English. Shortly after arriving, he found his first students at nearby Brown University, most of whom came by way of a recommendation from a professor there. Among these first students was Jacob Perl (Wubong), who helped to found the Providence Zen Center with the others.

In 1974, Seung Sahn began founding more Zen centers in the United States—his school still yet to be established—beginning with Dharma Zen Center in Los Angeles—a place where laypeople and the ordained could practice and live together. That following year, he went on to found the Chogye International Zen Center of New York City, and then, in 1977, Empty Gate Zen Center. Meanwhile, in 1979, the Providence Zen Center moved from its location in Providence to its current space in Cumberland, Rhode Island.

The Kwan Um School of Zen was founded in 1983 and, unlike more traditional practice in Korea, Seungsahn allowed laypersons in the lineage to wear the robes of full monastics, upsetting some in the Jogye Order by allowing lay Dharma teachers to wear long robes.

Celibacy was not required and the rituals of the school are unique. Although the Kwan Um School does utilize traditional Seon and Zen rituals, elements of their practice also closely resemble rituals found often in Pure Land Buddhism, Chan Buddhism, and the Huayan school. In 1986, along with a former student and Dharma heir Dae Gak, Seungsahn founded a retreat center and temple in Clay City, Kentucky called Furnace Mountain—the temple name being Kwan Se Um San Ji Sah (or, Perceive World Sound High Ground Temple). The center functions independently of the Kwan Um organization today.

Over his tenure as Guiding Teacher, Seungsahn appointed many Dharma heirs. He created the title Ji Do Poep Sa Nim (JDPSN) for those not ready for full dharma transmission but capable of teaching at a higher capacity. In 1977, Seungsahn was hospitalized for cardiac arrhythmia and it was then discovered that he had advanced diabetes. He had been in and out of hospitals for heart complications for years preceding his death, and in 1987 began spending much less time at his residence in the Providence Zen Center.

Starting in 1990, and under invitation from Mikhail Gorbachev, Seungsahn began making trips to the Soviet Union to teach. His student, Myong Gong Sunim, later opened a practice center in the country (Novgorod Center of Zen Meditation).

Teaching style

Seungsahn implemented the use of simple phraseology to convey his messages, delivered with charisma, which helped make the teachings easier to consume for Western followers. Some of his more frequently employed phrases included "only go straight" or "only don't know". He even went so far as to call his teachings "Don't Know Zen", which was reminiscent of the style of Bodhidharma. Seungsahn used correspondences between him and his students as teaching opportunities. Back-and-forth letters allowed for a kind of dharma combat through the mail and made him more available to the school's students in his absence. This was another example of his skillful implementation of unorthodox teaching methods, adapting to the norms of Western culture and thus making himself more accessible to those he taught. He was a supporter of what he often termed "together action"—encouraging students to make the lineage's centers their home and practice together.

Seungsahn also developed his own kōan study program for students of the Kwan Um School, known today as the "Twelve Gates". These twelve kōans are a mixture of ancient cases and cases which he developed. Before receiving inka to teach (in Kwan Um, inka is not synonymous with Dharma transmission), students must complete the Twelve Gates, though often they will complete hundreds more. One of the more well known cases of the Twelve Gates is "Dropping Ashes on the Buddha", the Sixth Gate, which is also the title of one of his books. In the book The Compass of Zen, this kong-an is transcribed as follows: "Somebody comes to the Zen center smoking a cigarette. He blows smoke and drops ashes on the Buddha." Seungsahn then poses the question, "If you are standing there at that time, what can you do?" Not included in this version of the kōan is the Kwan Um School of Zen's following side note on the case, "[H]ere is an important factor in this case that has apparently never been explicitly included in its print versions. Zen Master Seung Sahn has always told his students that the man with the cigarette is also very strong and that he will hit you if he doesn't approve of your response to his actions."

When Seungsahn first began teaching in the United States, there was an underemphasis in his message on the significance of zazen. Under advice from some students, however, he soon came to incorporate zazen into the curriculum more frequently. More than a few of his earliest students had practiced Zen previously under the Sōtō priest Shunryū Suzuki, laying out a convincing argument about how zazen and Zen were seen as inseparable in the Western psyche.

Later life
Throughout the 1990s, Seung Sahn made trips to Israel, which led to the 1999 opening of the Tel Aviv Zen Center. His remaining years were spent in particularly poor health. He had a pacemaker put in his chest in 2000, followed by renal failure in 2002. In June 2004, he was given the honorific title Dae Jong Sa "Great Lineage Master" by the Jogye Order in commemoration of his accomplishments, the highest title the order can grant.

Death
Seung Sahn died on November 30, 2004, at the age of 77 in Seoul, South Korea at Hwagaesa, the first temple where he served as abbot.

Controversies
In 1988, Seung Sahn admitted to having sexual relationships with several students. Because Seung Sahn was understood to be a celibate monk, the revelation of the affairs caused some members to leave the school. Seung Sahn did two repentance ceremonies and the Kwan Um School of Zen has since developed an ethics policy that has guidelines for teacher/student relationships and consequences for unethical behavior.

According to Sandy Boucher in Turning the Wheel: American Women Creating the New Buddhism:

Seung Sahn's lineage

The following list documents Seung-Sahn Haeng-Won's transmission lineage, starting with the Buddha and the First Patriarch.

India

China

Korea

Dharma heirs

Bo Mun
Bon Yeon
Dae Gak
Dae Kwang
Hae Kwang
Soeng Hyang
Su Bong
Won Gwang
Wu Bong
Wu Kwang

Bibliography

Other media

Audio
2000  Chanting Instructional CD
Perceive World Sound Zen Chanting CD (from 1978)

Video
1992 Wake Up! On the Road with a Zen Master (DVD and VHS) - Watch on YouTube
1993 Sun Rising East (VHS)

See also
Buddhism in the United States
Buddhist Patriarch
The Compass of Zen
Timeline of Zen Buddhism in the United States

References

External links

When two masters meet Kalu Rinpoche of Tibet and the Korean Zen master Seung Sahn

1927 births
2004 deaths
Chogye Buddhists
Kwan Um School of Zen
Seon Buddhist monks
78
Korean Buddhist missionaries
South Korean Buddhist monks
South Korean Zen Buddhists
Zen Buddhist spiritual teachers
Zen Buddhism writers
20th-century Buddhist monks
People from South Pyongan